Events from the year 1989 in the United Arab Emirates.

Incumbents
President: Zayed bin Sultan Al Nahyan 
Prime Minister: Rashid bin Saeed Al Maktoum

Births

 18 January - Sultan Bargash.
 23 March - Josh Dela Cruz.
 16 April - Mohamed Ahmed.

References

 
Years of the 20th century in the United Arab Emirates
United Arab Emirates
United Arab Emirates
1980s in the United Arab Emirates